Ruslan Mikhailovich Provodnikov (born 20 January 1984) is a Russian former professional boxer and politician. In boxing he competed from 2006 to 2016, and held the WBO junior welterweight title from 2013 to 2014. He challenged once for the WBO welterweight title in 2013 against Timothy Bradley, in a fight that was named Fight of the Year by The Ring magazine and the Boxing Writers Association of America.

During the prime of his career, Provodnikov was known as a highly aggressive pressure fighter possessing formidable punching power, stamina and an exceptionally durable chin.

Personal life
Provodnikov said that he wanted to learn English. Provodnikov was translated to have said, "I think boxing saved my life", as part of a translation of a statement Provodnikov made in response to an interviewer's question about what career he would have chosen if he was not a boxer.

Early life
Ruslan Mikhailovich Provodnikov was born in Beryozovo, a small village in Western Siberia to an ethnic Russian father and an ethnic Mansi mother, but identifies himself as Mansi. Provodnikov said that he used to street-fight as a child, so his dad took him to a boxing trainer when he was ten years old to box. He would regularly make a 1-day trip to train at a gym that was something closer to what a professional boxing gym should be. As an amateur he won 130 of 150 fights. He was discovered in Ekaterinburg by his current promoters and managers, who brought him to the U.S.

Other sports
Provodnikov said that he enjoyed playing soccer and basketball.

Life for his son
Provodnikov said he wanted to provide for his son and give his son options in life. He said he was having his son grow up in the same place where he did, and that he wanted his son to experience the way he lived. He said he wanted his son to play sports and watch less TV and use the internet less.

Eating meat
Provodnikov said that he enjoyed eating raw meat such as raw moose liver and raw fish, and he said that he believed that eating meat made him strong.

Professional career

Early career 
Provodnikov fought several times on ESPN 2's Friday Night Fights and developed a reputation for being an exciting, come forward, pressure fighter. He scored a decision win over Demarcus Corley and lost a controversial decision to Mauricio Herrera.

Provodnikov vs. Bradley 
Provodnikov lost a close unanimous decision to Timothy Bradley on March 16, 2013, for the WBO welterweight championship. Provodnikov was considered an easily beatable opponent for Bradley, who was looking for a confidence booster after beating Manny Pacquiao in what was deemed one of boxing's worst decisions. Bradley came out on the attack early, fighting in an uncharacteristically aggressive fashion. Provodnikov made him pay, however, tagging him with hard shots in the first round, and staggering him in the second. Bradley said after the fight that he was concussed by a shot Provodnikov hit him with in the second round. Bradley boxed more conservatively as the fight wore on, winning most of the middle rounds. In the last round, Provodnikov badly hurt Bradley again but Bradley took a knee with just seconds remaining, beating the count and hanging on to win the fight on points. Bradley was impressed by Provodnikov's power and will, saying "he's going to be a world champion someday". The fight was named "2013 Fight of the Year" by Ring Magazine and the Boxing Writers Association of America.

CompuBox Stats (General)

Provodnikov vs. Alvarado 
Moving back down to junior welterweight to fight Mike Alvarado for the WBO Junior welterweight belt. Provodnikov defeated Mike Alvarado by 10th-round stoppage on October 19, 2013, at the FirstBank Center in Denver, Colorado. Provodnikov was ahead on all three scorecards and had knocked Alvarado down twice in the eighth round. Alvarado then elected to not come out for the eleventh round.

Provodnikov vs. Algieri 
Provodnikov faced little-known American Chris Algieri in the first defense of his title on June 14, 2014, at the Barclays Center in Brooklyn, New York. Provodnikov connected with a left hook in the first round that knocked Algieri down and formed a large swelling under the challenger's right eye. Despite scoring two knockdowns in the opening frame, Algieri's footwork and boxing skills prevented Provodnikov from getting into range to land his shots. Provodnikov would go on to lose a controversial split decision.

Provodnikov vs. Matthysse 
After dispatching of veteran Jose Luis Castillo in five rounds, in his home country. Negotiations began for a bout with fellow power puncher, Argentine Lucas Matthysse, there was a large amount of hype surrounding the fight coming in. It took place at the Turning Stone Resort & Casino, Verona, New York on the 18th of April, and lived up to the hype as the two fighters went toe to toe from the opening bell in a fight of the year candidate. A headbutt caused a deep cut above Ruslan's left eye early in the fight and it begun to distract him straight away. Matthysse utilized his jab and superior boxing skills for most of the bout. Ruslan once again proved to have a granite chin as he took the hardest shots of Matthysse, who is considered to be the hardest puncher in the division and pound for pound one of the hardest punchers in the world. After being outboxed the first few rounds, Ruslan came back in the latter half of the bout, and begun to break down Matthysse, hurting him severely in the 11th round but failed to capitalize, or achieve enough early on and went on to lose a Majority decision. Matthysse broke his right hand in the fight. Provodnikov had a terribly swollen face afterwards, and a deep gash on his eye from the headbutt, he also had black urine (rhabdomyolysis), a result of being hit in his kidneys by the power puncher Matthysse.

Provodnikov vs. Rodriguez 
On 7 November, 2015, Provodnikov faced Jesus Alvarez Rodriguez. The former champ knocked out the previously unbeaten Rodriguez in round four.

Provodnikov vs Molina Jr 
On 11 June, 2016, Provodnikov faced John Molina Jr. Provodnikov lost in his Showtime debut via unanimous decision, with all three judges scoring the fight in favor of Molina Jr, 112-116, 113-115 and 111-117.

Professional boxing record

References

External links

Ruslan Provodnikov - Profile, News Archive & Current Rankings at Box.Live

1984 births
Living people
Welterweight boxers
Russian male boxers
Mansi people
World Boxing Organization champions
World light-welterweight boxing champions
People from Beryozovsky District, Khanty-Mansi Autonomous Okrug
Sportspeople from Khanty-Mansi Autonomous Okrug